Villaine may refer to:

Aubert de Villaine, a French winemaker and social economist
Vilaine, the historical spelling of a river in France

See also
Villain (disambiguation)